Lieutenant Colonel Dewan Ranjit Rai, MVC (1913 - 1947) was an Indian Army officer who played a key role during the Indo-Pakistani War of 1947. As the Commanding Officer of the 1st battalion, The Sikh Regiment (1 Sikh), he was the first recipient of the Maha Vir Chakra, which was awarded posthumously.

1 Sikh was the first unit to be inducted into the war, when it was airlifted from Gurgaon to Srinagar on 27 October 1947. This day is celebrated as the Infantry Day by the Indian Army.
Under the command of Rai, the battalion fought with tremendous spirit and bravery and played a key role in saving the valley of Kashmir from the invaders.

Early life

Rai was born in Gujranwala in a Punjabi family on 6 February 1913. He studied at the Bishop Cotton School, Shimla. He attended the first course at the Indian Military Academy, Dehradun. Later, he was among the first Indian officers to be posted to Command and Staff College, Quetta as an instructor.

Military career

Rai was commissioned on 1 February 1935 with the officer service number IC-12. On commissioning, he was attached for a year to a British Army regiment, the King's Shropshire Light Infantry stationed in India. He was appointed to the British Indian Army and posted to the 5th battalion, 11th Sikh Regiment on the 24 February 1936. He was promoted Lieutenant on 4 May 1936 He was promoted Captain on 4 February 1942 and by April 1944, he was serving as a temporary Major on the Recruiting Staff. He was selected for posting as a Military attaché at Washington, D.C. just before the break out of the Indo-Pakistani War of 1947, but this assignment was changed when he was selected for this mission to Kashmir.
 
He was commanding the 1st battalion of the Sikh Regiment in Gurgaon, making arrangements for refugees, when Pakistan invaded Jammu and Kashmir. Two companies of his troops were airlifted in 30 Dakota aircraft, one of which was flown by Biju Patnaik (later Chief Minister of Odisha), to Srinagar. The Operation's Order was handed over to him by then Captain S K Sinha, who retired as a lieutenant general and was later Governor of Jammu and Kashmir.

Rai led his troops to defend the Baramulla-Srinagar highway near Pattan against the numerically superior Pakistani tribal irregulars who were moving towards Srinagar after looting, raping and burning people of all religions in Baramulla. He successfully protected the Srinagar airfield, paving the way for more Indian troops to land who expelled the Pakistani tribal irregulars. He died on 27 October 1947 leading his men and defending Pattan. He was the first officer of the Indian Army after independence to fight a battle on 27 October 1947.

Maha Vir Chakra

Lieutenant Colonel Dewan Ranjit Rai was honoured with a Maha Vir Chakra. He was the first recipient of the award.

The citation for the Maha Vir Chakra reads as follows:

See also

 Harbaksh Singh

References

External links

  Man who saved Kashmir

1947 deaths
People of the Indo-Pakistani War of 1947
People from Gujranwala
Military personnel from Punjab, India
Indian Army personnel of World War II
British Indian Army officers
Recipients of the Maha Vir Chakra
Indian military personnel killed in action
1913 births